Nepenthes barcelonae is a tropical pitcher plant native to the Philippine island of Luzon. It is known from a single mountain in the Sierra Madre range of Aurora Province, where it grows in stunted submontane forest.

The specific epithet barcelonae honours Julie F. Barcelona, who discovered the species in February 2014 together with Danilo Tandang and Pieter B. Pelser.. 

Nepenthes barcelonae inhabits stunted submontane forest at altitudes of 1500-1700 m a.s.l. in the Sierra Madre Mountains of Luzon, Philippines. The specific type locality was not included in the species description to prevent pressures upon wild populations by hobbyists. Four species of Nepenthes have been described from the northern Visayas and Luzon (at the time of the species description), of which two are found on Luzon; the closely allied Nepenthes ventricosa, which is widespread across the island, and Nepenthes alzapan. Under Criterion B2ab(iii) of IUCN 2014, the species was assessed informally as Critically Endangered by the authors - it occurred in a single location, with an area of occupancy and extent of occurrence less than 10km². It is additionally threatened by poaching, and the encroachment of habitat degradation, namely in the form of slash-and-burn agriculture and illegal logging operations, which were present at lower elevations.

References

External links
 Climbing Mt. Mingan 

Carnivorous plants of Asia
barcelonae
Plants described in 2015
Taxa named by Martin Cheek
Taxa named by Danilo Tandang